Codonanthopsis crassifolia is a species of plant in the family Gesneriaceae.

References

Gesnerioideae